This is an alphabetical list of mainstream rock performers spanning all subgenres and fusions within the genre of rock music.  Artists included are known for creating material predominantly within a style of rock music (Rock & Roll, Metal, Punk, Alternative, etc.);  have enjoyed considerable success on singles or album charts;  recorded multiple songs that have endured or increased in popularity over time and continue to receive heavy airplay, streaming or downloads;  and garnered a significant following.  Solo artists are sorted by surname.

0-9

 10cc
 10 Years
 3 Doors Down
 311
 .38 Special

A

Accept
 AC/DC
 Bryan Adams
 Aerosmith
 AFI
 Air Supply
 The Alan Parsons Project
 Alice in Chains
 The All-American Rejects
 The Allman Brothers Band
 Alter Bridge
 Ambrosia
 America
 The Animals
 Adam Ant
 Anthrax
 April Wine
 Arcade Fire
 Arctic Monkeys
 Asia
 Audioslave
 Avenged Sevenfold
 Awolnation

B

 The B-52s
 Bachman–Turner Overdrive
 Bad Company
 Badfinger
 The Band
 The Bangles
 Barenaked Ladies
 Bay City Rollers
 The Beach Boys
 The Beatles
 Beck
 Ben Folds Five
 Pat Benatar
 Chuck Berry
 The Big Bopper
 Billy Talent
 The Black Crowes
 The Black Keys
 Black Sabbath
 Black Stone Cherry
 Black Veil Brides
 Blink-182
 Bloodhound Gang
 Blue October
 Blue Öyster Cult
 Blues Traveler
 James Blunt
 Blur
 Bon Jovi
 Boston
 David Bowie
 Bowling for Soup
 Boys Like Girls
 Bread
 Breaking Benjamin
 Bring Me the Horizon
 Jackson Browne
 Buckcherry
 Jeff Buckley
 Bullet for My Valentine
 Bush
 The Byrds

C

 Cage the Elephant
 Cake
 Canned Heat
 The Cab
 The Cardigans
 The Cars
 Catfish and the Bottlemen
 Harry Chapin
 Tracy Chapman
 Cheap Trick
 Chevelle
 Chicago
 Chubby Checker
 Cinderella
 City and Colour
 Eric Clapton
 The Clash
 Eddie Cochran
 Joe Cocker
 Coheed and Cambria
 Cold Chisel
 Coldplay
 Collective Soul
 Phil Collins
 Alice Cooper
 Chris Cornell
 Elvis Costello
 Counting Crows
 The Cranberries
 Crash Test Dummies
 Cream
 Creed
 Creedence Clearwater Revival
 Jim Croce
 Crosby, Stills, Nash & Young
 Christopher Cross
 Sheryl Crow
 Crowded House
 The Cult
 The Cure

D

 Damn Yankees
 Dashboard Confessional
 Daughtry
 The Dave Clark Five
 Dave Matthews Band
 Days of the New
 Death Cab for Cutie
 Deep Purple
 Def Leppard
 Deftones
 Depeche Mode
 Bo Diddley
 Dio
 Dire Straits
 Disturbed
 Fats Domino
 Donovan
 The Doobie Brothers
 The Doors
 Dr. Hook & the Medicine Show
 Dropkick Murphys
 Drowning Pool
 Duran Duran
 Ian Dury & the Blockheads
 Bob Dylan

E

 Eagles
 Echo & the Bunnymen
 Duane Eddy
 The Edgar Winter Group
 Electric Light Orchestra
 Emerson, Lake & Palmer
 England Dan & John Ford Coley
 Melissa Etheridge
 Europe
 Evanescence
 Everclear
 Everlast
 The Everly Brothers
 Extreme

F

 Faces
 Faith No More
 Fall Out Boy
 Bryan Ferry
 Filter
 Finger Eleven
 FireHouse
 Five Finger Death Punch
 Five for Fighting
 The Fixx
 The Flaming Lips
 Fleetwood Mac
 Flogging Molly
 Florence + the Machine
 Flyleaf
 Foals
 Dan Fogelberg
 John Fogerty
 Foo Fighters
 Foreigner
 Foster the People
 The Four Seasons
 Peter Frampton
 Franz Ferdinand
 The Fray
 Glenn Frey
 Fuel
 Fun.

G

 Peter Gabriel
 Garbage
 Genesis
 Ghost
 Gin Blossoms
 Gary Glitter
 The Go-Go's
 Godsmack
 Golden Earring
 Goo Goo Dolls
 Good Charlotte
 Grand Funk Railroad
 Grateful Dead
 Great White
 Green Day
 Greta Van Fleet
 The Guess Who
 Guns N' Roses

H

 Halestorm
 Bill Haley & His Comets
 Hall & Oates
 George Harrison
 Heart
 Jimi Hendrix
 Don Henley
 Herman's Hermits
 Highly Suspect
 Hinder
 The Hives
 Hole
 The Hollies
 Buddy Holly
 Hoobastank
 Hootie & the Blowfish

I

 Icehouse
 Billy Idol
 Imagine Dragons
 Incubus
 Interpol
 INXS
 Iron Maiden

J

 The J. Geils Band
 The Jam
 Tommy James and the Shondells
 Jane's Addiction
 Jefferson Airplane
 Jefferson Starship
 The Jesus and Mary Chain
 Jet
 Jethro Tull
 Joan Jett & the Blackhearts
 Jimmy Eat World
 Billy Joel
 Elton John
 Janis Joplin
 Journey
 Joy Division
 Judas Priest

K

 Kaiser Chiefs
 Kaleo
 Kansas
 Keane
 Kid Rock
 The Killers
 Killswitch Engage
 Kings of Leon
 The Kinks
 Kiss
 Korn
 Lenny Kravitz

L

 Lacuna Coil
 Lamb of God
 Avril Lavigne
 Led Zeppelin
 John Lennon
 Huey Lewis and the News
 Jerry Lee Lewis
 Lifehouse
 Limp Bizkit
 Linkin Park
 Little Richard
 Little River Band
 Live
 Living Colour
 Kenny Loggins
 Loverboy
 The Lovin' Spoonful
 The Lumineers
 Lynyrd Skynyrd

M

 The Mamas & the Papas
 Marilyn Manson
 The Marshall Tucker Band
 Matchbox Twenty
 John Mayer
 Paul McCartney
 Meat Loaf
 Megadeth
 John Mellencamp
 Men at Work
 Metallica
 Midnight Oil
 Mike + the Mechanics
 Modest Mouse
 Eddie Money
 The Monkees
 The Moody Blues
 Alanis Morissette
 Van Morrison
 Morrissey
 Mötley Crüe
 Motörhead
 Mudvayne
 Mumford & Sons
 Muse
 My Chemical Romance

N

 Nickelback
 Stevie Nicks
 Harry Nilsson
 Nine Inch Nails
 Nirvana
 No Doubt
 Ted Nugent

O

 Oasis
 The Offspring
 Roy Orbison
 Ozzy Osbourne
 Our Lady Peace
 The Outfield

P

 P.O.D.
 Panic! at the Disco
 Pantera
 Papa Roach
 Paramore
 Pearl Jam
 A Perfect Circle
 Tom Petty and the Heartbreakers
 Pink Floyd
 Pixies
 Robert Plant
 Poison
 The Police
 Iggy Pop
 Pop Evil
 The Presidents of the United States of America
 The Pretenders
 Elvis Presley
 The Pretty Reckless
 Primus
 Puddle of Mudd

Q

 Queen
 Queens of the Stone Age
 Queensrÿche
 Quiet Riot

R

 R.E.M.
 Radiohead
 Rage Against the Machine
 Rainbow
 Rammstein
 Ramones
 Red Hot Chili Peppers
 Lou Reed
 REO Speedwagon
 Rise Against
 The Rolling Stones
 Linda Ronstadt
 Roxy Music
 Royal Blood
 Rush

S

 Saliva
 Sam Fender
 Santana
 Joe Satriani
 Saving Abel
 Scorpions
 The Script
 Seether
 Bob Seger & the Silver Bullet Band
 Sepultura
 Sex Pistols
 Shakin' Stevens
 Shinedown
 Silverchair
 Simon & Garfunkel
 Simple Minds
 Simple Plan
 Skid Row
 Skillet
 Slade
 Slayer
 Slipknot
 Small Faces
 Smash Mouth
 The Smashing Pumpkins
 The Smiths
 Smokie
 Snow Patrol
 Social Distortion
 Soundgarden
 Bruce Springsteen
 Billy Squier
 Staind
 Ringo Starr
 Starset
 Starship
 Status Quo
 Steely Dan
 Steppenwolf
 Steve Miller Band
 Rod Stewart
 Sting
 The Stone Roses
 Stone Sour
 Stone Temple Pilots
 The Strokes
 Styx
 Sublime
 Sum 41
 Supertramp
 Survivor
 Sweet
 System of a Down

T

 T. Rex
 Talking Heads
 James Taylor
 Tenacious D
 Tesla
 Theory of a Deadman
 Thin Lizzy
 Third Eye Blind
 Thirty Seconds to Mars
 George Thorogood and the Destroyers
 Thousand Foot Krutch
 Three Days Grace
 Three Dog Night
 Tool
 Toto
 Traffic
 The Tragically Hip
 Train
 The Traveling Wilburys
 Travis
 Trivium
 Twenty One Pilots
 Twisted Sister

U

 U2
 Uriah Heep
 The Used

V

 Steve Vai
 Ritchie Valens
 Vampire Weekend
 Van Halen
 Stevie Ray Vaughan and Double Trouble
 Velvet Revolver
 The Velvet Underground
 The Verve
 Volbeat

W

 Joe Walsh
 Warrant
 Weezer
 Jack White
 The White Stripes
 White Zombie
 Whitesnake
 The Who
 Wings
 Steve Winwood

X

Y

 The Yardbirds
 Yes
 Neil Young

Z

 Frank Zappa
 Rob Zombie
 The Zombies
 ZZ Top

References

Lists of rock musicians